Confluence World School is a co-educational private school in Rudrapur, Uttarakhand, India.

Overview 
Confluence World School is a co-educational day school in Rudrapur and is located on the National Highway 74 towards Kichha. It was founded by GSIC Education  and started operations in April 2012. Confluence is affiliated with CBSE Board

Campus 
The school has a science laboratory, computer and ICT labs, robotics and math lab, music and dance rooms, lunch room and sports facilities. It does not have air-conditioned classroom.

World Class Infrastructure
The school is being built in an area of 6 acres on which roughly 140,000 sq. ft. constructed area is planned. The campus has been designed to have a spread out architecture that provides for spacious classrooms, maximum facilities for sports and co-curricular activities along with ample spaces for children to explore and learn. There are provisions for high-end facilities like:

Sports facilities
 The auditorium used as a multipurpose hall for sports like skating, gymnastics, yoga and aerobics.
 A half Olympic size  solar heated indoor swimming pool.
 An open field with an 8 lane 200-m Track and provision for athletics, football and hockey.
 Separate areas to be developed for cricket nets and horse riding.
 Basketball, tennis, and badminton courts.

Academic facilities
 Non-AC but spacious, airy and cool classrooms with optimized daylight.
 Robotics, English Language, EVS, math, integrated science, physics, chemistry, biology and computer science labs.
 Well equipped library for both junior and senior levels.
 A 2 MBPS Internet link, along with LAN connectivity in every room in the school building.

Transport
 Air-conditioned transportation for students within a radius of about 35 km

Security
 Security booths with guards round the clock, and facility of CCTV Camera monitoring the campus movements for added security.

Curriculum and methodology 
The school has collaborated with Shri Educare Limited  and uses the teaching-learning methodology of The Shri Ram School  (consistently ranked as country's top school) and is looking at developing and using its own innovative methodologies for teaching and learning.

Shri Educare Limited 
Shri Educare Limited is engaged in establishing, running and managing educational institutions in line with values and principles of The Shri Ram Schools. SEL comes from the heritage of leaders/educationalists such as Sir Shri Ram, Dr. Bharat Ram and Ms. Manju Bharat Ram who have set up institutions such as the Lady Shri Ram College, Shri Ram College of Commerce and The Shri Ram Schools.

References 

Private schools in Uttarakhand
Education in Udham Singh Nagar district
Educational institutions established in 2012
2012 establishments in Uttarakhand